Jenene Nagy, a native of New York is a Portland, Oregon, based installation artist and curator.  She received her Master of Fine Arts from the University of Oregon in 2004 and has co-curated the noted Tilt Gallery and Project Space in the Everett Station Lofts since January 2006.

Known for her space shaping architectural interventions debuted at THE HOOK UP exhibition at the New American Art Union (June 2007), her work has grown exponentially in later shows like False Flat and S/plit in the Portland Art Museum's Apex Program.

References

External links
 Artist's home page

Living people
Artists from Portland, Oregon
University of Oregon alumni
Artists from New Jersey
Year of birth missing (living people)
American women curators
American curators
American women installation artists
American installation artists
21st-century American artists
21st-century American women artists